Cielcza  is a village in the administrative district of Gmina Jarocin, within Jarocin County, Greater Poland Voivodeship, in west-central Poland.

The village has a population of 2,044.

History
Following the invasion of Poland and the outbreak of the Second World War in September 1939, Cielcza was occupied by Nazi Germany and renamed Fürstenau. It was administered within Reichsgau Wartheland as part of the district or county (kreis) of Jarotschin. Following the arrival of the Red Army in January 1945 and the end of the war, it became part of the People's Republic of Poland.

References

Cielcza